Yang Xusong (February 1962 – 8 November 2022) was a Chinese politician. A member of the Communist Party, he served as mayor of Shanwei from 2015 to 2020.

On 24 February 2018, he was elected as the representative of the 13th National People's Congress.

Yang died in Shenzhen on 8 November 2022, at the age of 60.

References

1962 births
2022 deaths
Chinese Communist Party politicians
Delegates to the 13th National People's Congress